The 1984 Roller Hockey World Cup was the twenty-sixth roller hockey world cup, organized by the Fédération Internationale de Roller Sports and the first edition since the creation of a B division in national roller hockey. It was contested by 10 national teams (6 from Europe, 3 from South America and 1 from North America). All the games were played in the city of Novara, in Italy, the chosen city to host the World Cup.

Results

Standings

See also
 FIRS Roller Hockey World Cup

External links
 1984 World Cup in rink-hockey.net historical database

Roller Hockey World Cup
International roller hockey competitions hosted by Italy
1984 in roller hockey
1984 in Italian sport